The Fort Independence Indian Community of Paiute Indians of the Fort Independence Reservation is a federally recognized tribe of Mono and Timbisha in the Owens Valley, in Inyo County, eastern California. As of the 2010 Census the population was 93.

Government
The Fort Independence Indian Community of Paiute Indians is headquartered in the town of Independence. The tribe is governed by a democratically elected tribal council. The current tribal administration is as follows.

 Chairman: Carl Dahlberg
 Vice Chairman: Alisa Lee
 Secretary Treasurer: Jack Bracken
 Gaming Commission: Wendy Stine, Chair, Daniel Miller, Vice  & Carl Dahlberg, Compliance Officer. 
 Tribal Administrator: Carl Dahlberg  
 Assistant Tribal Administrator: Cheyenne Stone
 Fiscal Manager: Anissa Eaton
 Fiscal Assistant: Brianne Bent
 Office Assistant: Jesseca Tsosie 

Enrollment into the tribe is based on the original allottees at the time, 1999, when the tribe's Article of Association where adopted and all living descendants of the original allottees who have a minimum of  Indian blood quantum, who are not enrolled in other tribes.

Reservation

It was established in 1915. In 1990, the reservation was  large with a population of 38 Indians.

Education
The reservation is served by the Owens Valley Unified School District.

See also
Indigenous peoples of California
Fort Independence (California)

Notes

References
 Pritzker, Barry M. A Native American Encyclopedia: History, Culture, and Peoples. Oxford: Oxford University Press, 2000.

External links
 Fort Independence Indian Reservation, official website
 Fort Independence Articles of Association, National Indian Law Library
 "Fort Independence Reservation Reduces Waste by 26% through Recycling," US Environmental Protection Agency

Native American tribes in California
Paiute
Shoshone
Inyo County, California
Owens Valley
Federally recognized tribes in the United States